This page shows the list of heritage structures in Tayabas, Quezon.

|}

References

Tayabas
Buildings and structures in Tayabas